K. Rani (4 September 1942 – 13 July 2018) was an Indian playback singer who has sung songs in Telugu, Tamil, Kannada, Malayalam, Hindi, Bengali, Sinhalese and Uzbek. Rani was the first female singer from India to sing in Sinhalese and Uzbek, and sang the national anthem of Sri Lanka (the "Sri Lanka Matha").

She performed before President of India Sarvepalli Radhakrishnan, and Indian National Congress leader K. Kamaraj called her "Innisai Rani". Rani was invited to perform at the Mokshagundam Visvesvaraya centennial, travelling in an aeroplane chartered by the government of Karnataka.
Raj Kapoor provided the rhythms when she sang Hindi songs, including "O Maine Pyar Kia, Mai Kya Karu Ram Mujhe Budda Mil Gaya", at a stage show.

Early life
Her family migrated from Kanpur to South India. Her father, Kishan Singh was a Railway Station Master and was transferred frequently from station to station. This gave Rani an opportunity to become conversant with different languages. At the age of 5 or 6 she got a chance to sing in a stage. She sang on stages where Vyjayanthimala's dance programs were taking place. She sang songs during the dress change-over interludes. One day, during such a program at Raja Annamalai Mandram, music composer C. R. Subburaman was present. He noticed the little girl's talent and introduced her as a playback singer in films.

Life and career
Rani's first films, in 1951 at age eight, were the Telugu Roopavathi and Tamil Mohana Sundaram and Singari. A year later, she was singing for lead characters in films like Kalyani, Kalyanam Panni Paar, Pelli Chesi Choodu, Dharma Devadhai and Dharma Devadha. Rani's "Antha Bhranthi Yenaa" (Telugu) and "Ellaam Maayai Thaanaa" (Tamil), from 1953's Devadasu, were popular.

She first performed in Sri Lankan cinema for Sujatha in 1953 under the direction of composer Ananda Samarakoon, and contributed to Seda Sulang in 1955 and Sirimali in 1959. Much sought after during the 1950s, Rani had few songs in the early 1960s. She sang Dravida Munnetra Kazhagam (DMK) songs and recorded Tamil Islamic songs with Nagore E. M. Hanifa.

Music composers she sang for

Fellow playback singers
Rani sang duets mostly with Ghantasala. Also with A. M. Rajah, P. B. Sreenivas, T. M. Soundararajan, Thiruchi Loganathan, Seerkazhi Govindarajan, S. C. Krishnan, V. N. Sundaram, K. H. Reddy, Pithapuram Nageswara Rao, Madhavapeddi Satyam, Talat Mahmood, K. Appa Rao, D. B. Ramachandra, K. Prasad Rao, B. N. Rao, T. R. Jayadev, B. Gopalam, T. G. Lingappa, K. V. Mahadevan, C. R. Subburaman, J. V. Raghavulu, A. L. Raghavan, K. R. Chellamuthu, S. V. Ponnusamy, Maadhavan, T. K. Ramachandran, Subramanyam, K. P. Udayabhanu, K. J. Yesudas, Nagendra, Ananda Samarakoon, Dharmadasa Walpola, Mohideen Baig, Sunil Premadasa and Christy Leonard Perera.

She sang duets with female singers, most notably Jikki but also with P. Leela, P. Susheela, K. Jamuna Rani. A. P. Komala, A. G. Rathnamala, Radha Jayalakshmi, Soolamangalam Rajalakshmi, R. Balasaraswathi Devi, N. L. Ganasaraswathi, M. S. Rajeswari, S. Janaki, Kalyani, Ramola, Sundaramma, T. S. Bagavathi, Swarnalata, N. Lalitha, P. S. Vaideghi, Udutha Sarojini, M. S. Padma, G. Kasthoori and L. R. Eswari.

The singing actors she sang with were J. P. Chandrababu and P. Bhanumathi.

Filmography

Tamil Islamic songs
Tamil Islamic songs with Nagore E. M. Hanifa:
 "Odhuvom Vaarungal" 
 "Dheenore Niyayama"
 "Vaazha Vaazha Nalla Vazhigal Undu"
 "Arul Mevum Aandavare"

DMK songs
Dravida Munnetra Kazhagam (DMK) songs with Hanifa:
 "Azhaikkindraar Azhaikkindraar Annaa"
 "Vaazhga Dhraavida Naadu"
 "Annaa Vaazhgave ... Annai Mozhi Kaatthu Nirkkum"

References

External links
List of Malayalam Songs by Singers K Rani

1943 births
2018 deaths
20th-century Indian singers
Indian women playback singers
Kannada playback singers
Malayalam playback singers
Tamil playback singers
Telugu playback singers
20th-century Indian women singers